Niveria nix is a species of small sea snail, a marine gastropod mollusk in the family Triviidae, the false cowries or trivias.

Distribution

Description 
The maximum recorded shell length is 11.5 mm.

Habitat 
Minimum recorded depth is 5 m. Maximum recorded depth is 116 m.

References

Triviidae
Gastropods described in 1922